Vladimir Petković (born 15 August 1963) is a Bosnian-born Swiss professional football manager and former player who was most recently the head coach of French side Bordeaux, having previously managed the Switzerland national team, a string of Swiss clubs, Turkish club Samsunspor,  Italian club Lazio.

Petković is from Sarajevo, Bosnia and Herzegovina. Apart from his Bosnian one, he also holds Swiss and Croatian passports.

Early life
Petković was born in Sarajevo, SFR Yugoslavia, modern-day Bosnia and Herzegovina, in 1963 to a Bosnian Croat family. He is a naturalized Swiss and holds Bosnian, Swiss and Croatian passports. His parents worked in education and due to the family's frequent moving, Petković changed schools several times. They first lived in Vrelo Bosne and then when he was five years old, in Hadžići near Sarajevo.

Playing career
A midfielder with good technique, Petković started playing football in Ilidža as an eleven-year-old before joining the youth sector of his hometown side FK Sarajevo as a fifteen-year-old.

He remained at FK Sarajevo and began his professional career there in the early 1980s. Petković made only a handful of appearances in a strong Sarajevo side led on the pitch by Bosnian Safet Sušić. Petković was a part of the Sarajevo side that won the 1984–85 Yugoslav First League, but made only two league appearances for them. His time at Sarajevo was interrupted by two brief stints elsewhere: first, a successful time with Rudar Prijedor where Petković showed good scoring ability; and then a less successful season in the Yugoslav Second League with a poor NK Koper side which was relegated after finishing last.

Petković emigrated from Yugoslavia in 1987, leaving FK Sarajevo and moving permanently to Switzerland, where he joined second division club Chur 97. After a season with Chur, Petković moved to the Swiss top division, joining a strong Sion side. Sion achieved a third-place finish in the Nationalliga but Petković left the club at the end of the season after only making six league appearances.

After leaving Sion, Petković moved back into the lower tiers, first joining Martigny-Sports before returning to his first Swiss club, Chur 97. Petković enjoyed a career as a regular goalscoring midfielder in the Swiss second division, which included two more stints at Bellinzona and Lugano.

Petković completed his playing career as a player-manager with Bellinzona and Malcantone Agno, the latter having later merged with financially stricken Lugano.

Managerial career

Coaching in Switzerland
After his retirement from playing, Petković became a coach and his first job was player-manager at Bellinzona in 1997. In 2004, he took over the reins at Lugano before returning to Bellinzona for the fourth time in his career, where he led the club to the 2008 Swiss Cup final, only to lose out to Basel, and promotion to the Swiss Super League. At the beginning of the 2008–09 season, he was appointed as manager of Young Boys. After taking charge at the club, Petković installed a 3–4–3 formation and took the Bern side to a second-placed league finish. After two more seasons with Young Boys, he was sacked after a 1–1 draw against Luzern on 7 May 2011. The club finished in third place in the league behind their rivals Zürich and Basel.

Samsunspor in Turkey and return to Switzerland
In 2011, he became the new manager of Turkish side Samsunspor. He resigned from that position in January 2012 with the club in the relegation zone. On 15 May 2012, he was named the new temporary manager of Sion until the end of the 2011–12 season.

Lazio
On 2 June 2012, Petković became the new manager of Italian side Lazio in Serie A. With the club, he won the Coppa Italia in 2013, thanks to a goal from Senad Lulić.

Switzerland national team
On 23 December 2013, it was announced that Petković was to succeed Ottmar Hitzfeld as the manager of the Switzerland national team after the 2014 FIFA World Cup. As a result, Claudio Lotito fired Petković claiming a breach of the contract due to not having been duly informed by Petković about the latter's ongoing negotiations with the Swiss Football Association. Petković was sacked as Lazio manager on 4 January 2014 and was replaced by Edy Reja, which resulted in a legal dispute concerning the contract termination.

Since his appointment to the national team spot in July 2014, Petković has guided the Swiss to the Round of 16 stages of both the UEFA Euro 2016 and the 2018 FIFA World Cup, along with the quarter-finals of UEFA Euro 2020. They also reached the 2019 UEFA Nations League Finals. At the UEFA Euro 2020, he led Switzerland to defeat world champions France 5–4 on penalties in the Round of 16, after a 3–3 draw, to qualify to the quarter-finals of the European Championship for the first time in their history.

Bordeaux
In late July 2021, Petković became the manager of French club Bordeaux. In February 2022, he was sacked as the team was struggling in the relegation positions in Ligue 1.

Charitable work
While living in Switzerland, Petković worked for Caritas Ticino, a Catholic relief development and social service organisation, for five years.

Managerial statistics

Honours

Player
Sarajevo 
Yugoslav First League: 1984–85

Manager
Malcantone Agno 
1. Liga: 2002–03

Lazio 
Coppa Italia: 2012–13

References

External links

BSC Young Boys profile 

Caritas Bern: Ein Mann, der Menschen motiviert, p. 16. 

1963 births
Living people
Footballers from Sarajevo
Bosnia and Herzegovina Roman Catholics
Croats of Bosnia and Herzegovina
Yugoslav emigrants to Switzerland
Bosnia and Herzegovina emigrants to Switzerland
Swiss people of Bosnia and Herzegovina descent
Swiss people of Croatian descent
Swiss Roman Catholics
Association football midfielders
Yugoslav footballers
Bosnia and Herzegovina footballers
Swiss men's footballers
FK Sarajevo players
FK Rudar Prijedor players
FC Koper players
FC Chur 97 players
FC Sion players
FC Martigny-Sports players
AC Bellinzona players
FC Locarno players
Yugoslav First League players
Yugoslav Second League players
Swiss Challenge League players
Swiss Super League players
Yugoslav expatriate footballers
Yugoslav expatriate sportspeople in Switzerland
Bosnia and Herzegovina expatriate footballers
Bosnia and Herzegovina expatriate sportspeople in Switzerland
Bosnia and Herzegovina football managers
Swiss football managers
AC Bellinzona managers
FC Lugano managers
BSC Young Boys managers
Samsunspor managers
FC Sion managers
S.S. Lazio managers
Switzerland national football team managers
FC Girondins de Bordeaux managers
Swiss Challenge League managers
Swiss Super League managers
Süper Lig managers
Serie A managers
UEFA Euro 2016 managers
2018 FIFA World Cup managers
UEFA Euro 2020 managers
Expatriate football managers in France
Expatriate football managers in Italy
Expatriate football managers in Switzerland
Expatriate football managers in Turkey
Bosnia and Herzegovina expatriate sportspeople in Turkey
Bosnia and Herzegovina expatriate sportspeople in Italy
Bosnia and Herzegovina expatriate sportspeople in France